Moultrie is an unincorporated community in Columbiana County, in the U.S. state of Ohio.

History
Moultrie was laid out in 1853. A post office called Moultrie was established in 1852, and remained in operation until 1944. Besides the post office, Moultrie had a gristmill, built in 1875.

References

Unincorporated communities in Columbiana County, Ohio
1853 establishments in Ohio
Populated places established in 1853
Unincorporated communities in Ohio